Giant  is a 1956 American epic Western drama film, directed by George Stevens from a screenplay adapted by Fred Guiol and Ivan Moffat from Edna Ferber's 1952 novel.

The film stars Elizabeth Taylor, Rock Hudson and James Dean and features Carroll Baker, Jane Withers, Chill Wills, Mercedes McCambridge, Dennis Hopper, Sal Mineo, Rod Taylor, Elsa Cárdenas and Earl Holliman.

Giant  was the last of James Dean's three films as a leading actor, and earned him his second and last Academy Award nomination – he was killed in a car crash before the film was released. His friend Nick Adams was called in to do some voice dubbing for Dean's role.

In 2005, the film was selected for preservation in the United States National Film Registry by the Library of Congress as being "culturally, historically, or aesthetically significant".

Plot

In the mid-1920s, wealthy Texas rancher Jordan "Bick" Benedict Jr. travels to Maryland on a horse-buying trip. He meets socialite Leslie Lynnton, who quickly ends a budding relationship with a British diplomat. After a whirlwind romance, Leslie and Bick marry and return to the Benedicts' Texas cattle ranch, Reata. Leslie has difficulty adjusting to her new life. Bick's older sister, Luz, runs the household and resents Leslie's intrusion. Leslie soon learns that she, like the other women, is expected to be subservient in the male-dominated Texas culture. Jett Rink, a ranch hand, becomes infatuated with Leslie. When Jett drives her around the county, Leslie observes the Mexican workers' terrible living conditions. She presses Bick to help improve their situation.

Luz is killed while riding Leslie's horse, War Winds, being bucked off after digging in her spurs as a hostile act towards Leslie. Luz leaves a small piece of Benedict land to Jett. Bick, who despises Jett, offers to buy the property at twice its value, but Jett refuses to sell and names his land 'Little Reata'.

Leslie and Bick have twins, Jordan III ("Jordy") and Judy and later have another daughter, Luz II. Bick continually favors his young son and pushes him into masculine pursuits, which the youngster resists. The marriage becomes strained, and Leslie takes the children to her parents for an extended visit. Bick goes to Maryland, and he and Leslie reconcile and return to Texas.

Jett continues working his land, eventually striking oil. Covered in crude, he drives to the Benedict house and proclaims he will be richer than them. Jett makes a pass at Leslie, leading to a brief fistfight with Bick before he drives off. Jett prospers over the years. He tries to persuade Bick to let him drill for oil on Reata. Bick, determined to preserve his family's cattle ranching legacy, refuses.

Years later, now 1941, tensions arise regarding the now-grown Benedict children. Bick intends that Jordy will succeed him and run the ranch, but Jordy wants to become a doctor. Leslie plans for Judy to attend finishing school in Switzerland, but she wants to study animal husbandry at Texas Tech. Each sibling successfully convinces one parent to persuade the other to allow them to pursue their own goals.

At the family Christmas party, Bick wants Judy's new husband, Bob Dace, to work on the ranch after he returns from World War II. Dace declines, saying he and Judy want to build their own life. Jett persuades Bick to allow oil drilling on his land. Realizing that his children will not take over the ranch when he retires, Bick agrees. Once oil production starts on the ranch, the Benedicts grow wealthier and more powerful.

The Benedict–Rink rivalry reaches a head when the Benedicts discover that Luz II has been having a secret romantic relationship with the much older Jett. At his Austin hotel, Jett hosts a huge party in his own honor. The Benedicts are guests, but Jett will not allow staff to serve Jordy's Mexican wife, Juana. Enraged, Jordy starts and loses a fight with Jett, who then has Jordy thrown out. Bick challenges Jett, but seeing that the drunken Jett is in no state to defend himself, he and the other Benedicts leave. Jett staggers into the banquet hall and sits in the seat of honor. He passes out as he attempts to give his speech  in front of the packed ballroom. Later, Luz II hears the slumped over Jett bemoaning his unrequited love for Leslie and leaves heartbroken; Jett topples over in a stupor and falls onto the floor.

Driving home the next day, the Benedicts stop at a diner. A sign at the counter states, "We reserve the right to refuse service to anyone," meaning ethnic minorities are unwelcome. Sarge, the racist owner, insults Juana and her and Jordy's young son. When Sarge ejects a Mexican family from the diner, Bick says to leave them alone. Bick fights Sarge, who beats him and then tosses the sign onto Bick. Back at Reata, Bick laments failing to preserve the Benedict family legacy. Leslie replies that, after the diner fight, he was her hero for the first time. She considers their own family legacy a success. They look at their two grandchildren, one Caucasian and one Hispanic.

Cast

Production

Writing
Ferber's character of Jordan Benedict II and her description of the Reata Ranch were based on Robert "Bob" J. Kleberg Jr. (1896–1974) and the King Ranch in Kingsville, Texas. Like the over half-million-acre Reata, King Ranch comprises 825,000 acres (3,340 km2; 1,289 sq mi) and includes portions of six Texas counties, including most of Kleberg County and much of Kenedy County, and was largely a livestock ranch before the discovery of oil. The fictional character Jett Rink was inspired partly by the extraordinary rags-to-riches life story of the wildcatter oil tycoon Glenn Herbert McCarthy (1907–1988). Author Edna Ferber met McCarthy when she was a guest at his Houston, Texas, Shamrock Hotel (known as the Shamrock Hilton after 1955), the fictional Emperador Hotel in both the book and the film.

Casting
The Australian actor Rod Taylor was cast in one of his early Hollywood roles after being seen in an episode of Studio 57, titled "The Black Sheep's Daughter".

Stevens gave Hudson a choice between Elizabeth Taylor and Grace Kelly to play the leading lady Leslie. Hudson chose Taylor.

After James Dean's death late in production, Nick Adams overdubbed some of Dean's lines, which were nearly inaudible, as Rink's voice. George Stevens had a reputation as a meticulous film editor, and the film spent an entire year in the editing room.

Filming

The film begins with Jordan "Bick" Benedict, played by Hudson, arriving at Ardmore, Maryland, to purchase a stallion from the Lynnton family. The first part of the picture was actually shot in Albemarle County, Virginia, and used the Keswick, Virginia, railroad station as the Ardmore railway depot. 
Much of the subsequent film, depicting "Reata", the Benedict ranch, was shot in and around the town of Marfa, Texas, and the remote, dry plains found nearby, with interiors filmed at the Warner Bros. studios in Burbank, California. The "Jett Rink Day" parade and airport festivities were filmed at the Burbank Airport.

Music
During the restaurant fight scene at the film's end, the jukebox plays The Yellow Rose of Texas by Mitch Miller. This version of the song happened to be the #1 pop single on the Billboard Magazine Best Sellers chart at the time of James Dean's death.

Themes
The movie is an epic portrayal of a powerful Texas ranching family challenged by changing times and the coming of big oil. A major subplot concerns the racism of many Anglo-European Americans in Texas during the mid-twentieth century and the discriminatory social segregation enforced against Mexican Americans. In the first third of the film, Bick and Luz treat the Mexicans who work on their ranch condescendingly, which upsets the more socially conscious Leslie. Bick eventually comes to realize his moral shortcomings –  in a climactic scene at a roadside diner he loses a fistfight to the racist owner, but earns Leslie's respect for defending the human rights of his brown-skinned daughter-in-law and grandson. Another subplot involves Leslie's own striving for women's equal rights as she defies the patriarchal social order, asserting herself and expressing her own opinions when the men talk. She protests being expected to suppress her beliefs in deference to Bick's; this conflict leads to their temporary separation.

Giant is Edna Ferber's third novel dealing with racism; the first was Show Boat (1926), which was adapted into the legendary Broadway musical Show Boat (1927); her second was Cimarron (1929), which was adapted to film twice, in 1931 and 1960. Ferber's Giant was a blockbuster, selling 52 million books by 1956.

Release
Giant premiered in New York City on October 10, 1956, with the local DuMont station, WABD, televising the arrival of cast and crew, as well as other celebrities and studio chief Jack L. Warner.  The picture was released to nationwide distribution on November 24, 1956.

Capitol Records, which had issued some of Dimitri Tiomkin's music from the soundtrack (with the composer conducting the Warner Brothers studio orchestra) on an LP, later digitally remastered the tracks and issued them on CD, including two tracks conducted by Ray Heindorf. Both versions used a monaural blend of the multi-channel soundtrack recording.

Home media
The film was released on DVD on June 10, 2003. The DVD includes more than three hours of documentaries. The out of print Blu-ray was released on November 5, 2013, as part of the James Dean Ultimate Collector's Edition set, and as an individual DigiBook release followed by a non-DigiBook Blu-ray on March 11, 2014. Those releases contained three discs including two DVDs with all the extras from the 2004 release. The full length George Stevens: A Filmmaker's Journey documentary is also included on one of the DVD discs. The upcoming manufacture-on-demand 4K Ultra HD release of the film is scheduled to be released on June 21, 2022, through Studio Distribution Services.

Reception
Giant won praise from both critics and the public, and according to the Texan author Larry McMurtry, was especially popular with Texans, even though it was sharply critical of Texan society. Bosley Crowther of the New York Times wrote that "George Stevens takes three hours and seventeen minutes to put his story across. That's a heap of time to go on about Texas, but Mr. Stevens has made a heap of film." He continued to write that "Giant, for all its complexity, is a strong contender for the year's top-film award."

Variety claimed that Giant was "for the most part, an excellent film which registers strongly on all levels, whether it's in its breathtaking panoramic shots of the dusty Texas plains; the personal, dramatic impact of the story itself, or the resounding message it has to impart."

In the 21st century, TV Guide gave the film four stars out of five, writing of James Dean's performance: "This was the last role in Dean's all-too-brief career – he was dead when the film was released – and his presence ran away with the film. He performs his role in the overwrought method manner of the era, and the rest of the cast seems to be split between awe of his talent and disgust over his indulgence."

The film received an 88% approval rating on Rotten Tomatoes based on 48 reviews, with an average rating of 7.70/10. The consensus reads, "Giant earns its imposing name with a towering narrative supported by striking cinematography, big ideas, and powerful work from a trio of legendary Hollywood leads."

Less complimentary was director and critic Francois Truffaut, who in an early review called Giant a ”silly, solemn, sly, paternalistic, demagogic movie without any boldness, rich in all sorts of concessions, pettiness, and contemptible actions.”

Box office
Giant was a huge box-office success. The film earned $35 million in ticket sales during its original studio release in 1956, a record for a Warner Brothers film until that time. This record was not surpassed until the Warner film Superman in the late 1970s.

The movie earned $12 million in rentals in the United States and Canada during its initial release. It did not perform as well in other markets where it made around half as much, but it was one of the biggest hits of the year in France, with admissions of 3,723,209.

Accolades

Other honors
American Film Institute recognition
 AFI's 100 Years...100 Movies – #82

Influence

Giant is considered to be the inspiration for the hit 1980s television drama Dallas. Both productions focus on the struggle between wealthy oilmen and cattlemen in Texas in the mid to late 20th century. In addition, both productions have an antagonist with the initials J.R.

In 1978, Martin Scorsese wrote about the movie as a guilty pleasure:
 I've seen this film over forty times. I don't like the obvious romanticism, and it's very studied, but there's more here than people have seen. It has to do with the depiction of a life style through the passage of so many years. You see people grow. I like James Dean; I like the use of music, even though Dimitri Tiomkin did it; I like Boris Leven's image of the house, and the changes in the house; I like the wide image of Mercedes McCambridge riding the bronco, then cut to an extreme closeup of her hitting the bronc with her spur, then back to the wide image. As far as filmmaking goes, Giant is an inspiring film. I don't mean morally, but visually. It's all visual.

The making of Giant was the background to the play and movie Come Back to the 5 & Dime, Jimmy Dean, Jimmy Dean.

In 1981, a Levi Strauss ad campaign and television commercial that launched the 501 jeans for women, by Mike Salsbury, an actress says "Travis you're years too late" evoking a scene with James Dean.

See also

List of American films of 1956

Notes

References

Further reading
 Tibbetts, John C., and James M. Welsh, eds. The Encyclopedia of Novels Into Film (2nd ed. 2005) pp 151–152.

External links

 
 
 
 
 
 
 Giant essay by Daniel Eagan in America's Film Legacy: The Authoritative Guide to the Landmark Movies in the National Film Registry, A&C Black, 2010 , pages 515-516

1956 drama films
1956 films
American drama films
American epic films
Films scored by Dimitri Tiomkin
Films about farmers
Films about race and ethnicity
Films based on American novels
Films directed by George Stevens
Films set in country houses
Films set on farms
Films set in Texas
Petroleum in Texas
Works about petroleum
Films set in the 1920s
Films set in the 1930s
Films set in the 1940s
Films shot in Texas
Films whose director won the Best Directing Academy Award
United States National Film Registry films
Warner Bros. films
James Dean
Films based on works by Edna Ferber
Marfa, Texas
Photoplay Awards film of the year winners
1950s English-language films
1950s American films